Gustavus Heinrich de Rosenthal (1753–1829) was a Baltic German soldier and member of the Baltic nobility born in Vaimõisa, present-day Estonia, with the Title of Baron and last name of von Wetter-Rosenthal, a junior line of the von Wetter-Tegenfeldens. He came into conflict with another man and was forced to flee the country after killing him in a duel.  He came to North America, where he served in the Continental Army using the name John Rose.

American Revolution
At the time of his departure from Europe, the American Revolution was under way. Rosenthal adopted the name John Rose and joined a unit from Pennsylvania. While stationed at Fort Ticonderoga, he befriended William Irvine who was an officer in the Continental Army.

He was part of the American invasion of Quebec and was present at the Battle of Trois-Rivières. He had much experience in the military which assisted him in establishing a reputation as a competent commander.

Crawford expedition

When William Irvine was transferred to the Western Department, Rose accompanied him. Irvine assigned him to the Crawford expedition under the command of Colonel William Crawford against the Upper Sandusky villages of the Wyandots and Delawares in 1782. Irvine ordered Rose to keep a detailed account of the expedition and record all the events. During the election of officers, Rose was elected adjutant with the rank of Major. Upon nearing the destination of the campaign, Rose was selected to lead an advance company of men to scout the area ahead and attempt to determine the location of the enemy. It was Rose who discovered and determined that the grove of trees known as "Battle Island" should be the point of defense for the army during the Battle of Sandusky.

Shortly after leaving the grove, the detachment spotted several Indians. After pursuing them some distance they were ambushed by the hidden force of Native Americans under the Wyandot chief Half King, the Delaware chiefs Captain Pipe and Wingenund and the British Indian agent Simon Girty. Rose led the company in a fighting retreat while sending back runners to alert the main army that they had engaged the Indian force. With the advance company retreating and the main army advancing, they met at the grove earlier discovered by Rose.

During the day of June 4 and the following day of June 5, the Indian force surrounded and attacked the army within the grove. Several attempts were made to penetrate the army's perimeter with little success; however, numerous parties of warriors continued to arrive to augment the numbers of the attackers and following the arrival of a number of Butler's Rangers and a party of Shawnee numbering near 200 under the Chief Black Snake, the battle began to go against the Americans.

Retreat and the Battle of the Olentangy 
Following the arrival of the British and Indian reinforcements, Colonel Crawford and Colonel David Williamson, the second in command, agreed that a retreat should be attempted on the night of June 5. As the men were preparing to leave the woods, small groups began to leave on their own causing the organized retreat to degenerate into a rout. A large body of men remained together under the leadership of Col David Williamson and Major Rose. The following day, Rose was again selected to lead an advance company to scout the terrain ahead. Later in the day, as the remains of the army approached the Olentangy River to water the horses and rest, the Indians and British attacked initiating the Battle of the Olentangy. After fierce fighting, the Americans were able to push the Indians and British back.

Realizing that the enemy would harass the rear of the army, Rose led the defense of a rear guard which kept the enemy at bay long enough to allow the army to leave the Olentangy River camp. On June 13 the remaining American army crossed the Ohio River into American territory. Rose delivered his report to General Irvine.

After the war
Following the American Revolution John Rose returned to Estonia and married. He raised a family and died in 1829. The journal which he had kept on the Crawford Expedition was part of his estate when he died. A family member later sent a copy to the Pennsylvania Historical Society giving Americans an excellent account of the campaign.

References

 History of Ohio: the rise and progress of an American state, Volume 2

Further reading
 Wetter, Mardee de. Incognito, An Affair of Honor. Barbed Wire Publishing, 2006. . A biography of Rosenthal.

1753 births
1829 deaths
Baltic-German people
German soldiers of the Continental Army
People of Pennsylvania in the American Revolution
German emigrants to the Thirteen Colonies